Oliver Chase Quick (21 June 1885 – 21 January 1944) was an English theologian, philosopher, and Anglican priest.

Early life and education
Oliver Quick was born on 21 June 1885 in Sedbergh, Yorkshire, the son of the educationist Robert Hebert Quick and Bertha Parr. He was educated at Harrow School and studied classics and theology at Corpus Christi College, Oxford.

Quick married Frances Winifred Pearson, a niece of Karl Pearson.

Ecclesiastical and academic career
Quick was ordained  in 1911 and to the priesthood in 1912. Prior to becoming chaplain to the Archbishop of Canterbury in 1915, he was a vice-principal of Leeds Clergy School and then a curate at St Martin-in-the-Fields, London. He was given his first incumbency in 1918 in his appointment to the vicarage of Kenley, Surrey. He went on to be appointed to residentiary canonries of Newcastle (1920), Carlisle (1923), and St Paul's (1930). He became a professor of theology at Durham University in 1934 and was appointed to a canonry of Durham Cathedral ex officio. He moved to Oxford in 1939, having been appointed to the Regius Professorship of Divinity at the University of Oxford, which carried with it a canonry of Christ Church Cathedral. He remained in the post until his death in 1944.

In his works he advocated the doctrines of soul sleep and conditional immortality. He was one of the leading exponents of orthodox Anglicanism and upheld a position similar to that of the authors of Essays Catholic and Critical (1926). He followed systematic and synthetic rather than historical methods and expressed his thought in a modern way.

Quick died on 21 January 1944 in Longborough, Gloucestershire, and was buried four days later in the churchyard in Longborough.

Published works

Books
 
 
 
 
 
 
 
  (Reissued several times, including a Fontana Library edition in 1964.)
 
 
 
 
 
 
  (Reissued several times including a Fontana Library edition in 1963.)

Book chapters
 "Goodness and Happiness". In A. D. Lindsay. Christianity and the Present Moral Unrest. London: George Allen & Unwin. pp. 73–86. 1926.
 "The Doctrine of the Church of England on Sacraments". In R. Dunkerley. The Ministry and the Sacraments. London: SCM Press. pp. 124–137. 1937.

Journal articles

Other

References

Citations

Works cited

Further reading

 
 
 
 

1885 births
1944 deaths
20th-century Anglican theologians
20th-century English Anglican priests
20th-century British philosophers
Alumni of Corpus Christi College, Oxford
Anglican philosophers
Annihilationists
English Anglican theologians
English philosophers
People educated at Harrow School
Regius Professors of Divinity (University of Oxford)